The Philippines competed at the 29th Southeast Asian Games which took place in Malaysia from 19 to 30 August 2017.  The Philippines contingent was composed of 497 athletes, 163 sporting officials and 70 administrative and medical staff who competed in 37 out of the 38 sports.  The Philippines finished the 29th SEA Games in 6th place with a medal haul of 23 Golds, 33 Silvers and 64 Bronze which is the country's worst finish in 18 years.  The next edition of the Southeast Asian Games was hosted by the Philippines in 2019.

Preparations  
A task force was created on December 21, 2016 composing of officials from the Philippine Sports Commission (PSC) and the Philippine Olympic Committee (POC) as part of the preparations of the Philippine delegate to the 2017 SEA Games. On December 23, 2016, they submitted the list of athletes by numbers to the SEA Games organizing committee. A list composes a total of 535 athletes from 31 sports. The task force has set a target of 1 gold medal for each sport.

The PSC has stated that they are not keen on sending athletes it deems undeserving for the regional games for the sake of sending a "bloated" delegation.  An evaluation and screening will be conducted by the task force to trim the size of the delegation and the task force is open to sending just 200 to 250 athletes. No futsal or cricket team will be sent, the latter because there is no POC-recognized NSA for cricket yet.

The task force released the criteria for the selection of participating athletes on December 22, 2016. Performance in the 2015 Southeast Asian Games, and other International competitions are a big part of the criteria. On the same day, participants at the 2016 Summer Olympics, and medalists at the 2014 Asian Games are already seeded a place in the 2017 SEA Games Philippine delegation by the task force but maintained that they have to be active and competitive.

Cynthia Carrion of gymnastics was appointed as the chef de mission of the Philippine delegate to the games on January 20, 2017.

The POC released initial number of athletes and officials that will form the Philippine SEA Games delegation on May 25, 2017. On the same day it was reported that the line up of athletes is 85-90 percent complete except for players in indoor hockey and volleyball. The "tentative" delegation is composed of 493 athletes set to compete in 37 out of 38 sports and 149 officials. By June 3, 2017 this figure was revised to 542 athletes set to compete in all 38 sports and 100 officials.

POC President Peping Cojuangco signed the final list of athletes on June 28, 2017. The delegation is composed of 497 athletes, as well as 163 coaches, and 70 administrative and medical personnel. The country will compete in all 38 sports except cricket.

Medalists
Medalists are entitled to incentive from the government through the Philippine Sports Commission per R.A. 10699.

Gold

Silver

Bronze

Multiple Medalists

Medal summary

By sports

By date

Archery

Men's Compound

Women's Compound

Men's Recurve

Women's Recurve

Athletics

Men's

Women's

Badminton

Basketball

Men's
Team

|}
| style="vertical-align:top;" |
 Head coach
 Jong Uichico
 Assistant coaches
 Jimmy Alapag
 Team manager
To be announced

Legend
(C) Team captain
(NP) Naturalized Player
Club – describes lastclub before the tournament
Age – describes ageon August 19, 2017

Source:
|}
Results

Women's
Team

Results

Billiards and Snooker

Men's

Women's

Boxing

Men's

Bowling

Singles

Doubles

Trios

Team

Masters

Figure skating

Fencing

Men's

Women's

Football

Men's

Head Coach: Marlon Maro

Group stage

Women's

Head coach: Marnelli Dimzon

Group stage

Netball

Ice hockey

Men's
Squad
Head coach:  Daniel Brodan

Results

Indoor hockey

Men's

Women's

Judo

Men's

Women's

Muaythai

Men's

Pencak Silat

Rugby Sevens

Men's

Women's

Short track speed skating

Taekwondo

Men's
Legend
SUP – Won by Superiority
PTG – Won by points gap

Women's

Poomsae

Tennis

Triathlon

Men's

Women's

Volleyball

Men's
Team

Results

Women's
Team

Results

Waterski

Weightlifting

Wushu

Men's Taolu

Women's Taolu

References

Southeast Asian Games
2017
Nations at the 2017 Southeast Asian Games